is a temple of the Nichiren branch of Buddhism located in Kyoto, Japan.

Honnō-ji incident
Honnō-ji is most famous for the Honnō-ji incident – the assassination of Oda Nobunaga –  that occurred there on 21 June 1582. Nobunaga lodged at the temple with little protection before his invasion of the west, but was betrayed by his general Akechi Mitsuhide, whose forces surrounded the temple and set it on fire. Knowing there was no way out for him, Nobunaga committed seppuku along with his attendant Mori Ranmaru. Ranmaru's brothers also perished at Honnō-ji.

In 1591, Nobunaga's successor Toyotomi Hideyoshi ordered the reconstruction of Honnō-ji, but on a different site due to the tragic circumstances. Honnō-ji was rebuilt on its current location in present-day Nakagyō Ward near Kyoto Shiyakusho-mae Station.

See also 
Glossary of Japanese Buddhism
Honnōji Hotel
List of National Treasures of Japan (temples)

References

External links
Honno-ji temple official website

Buddhist temples in Kyoto
Nichiren Buddhism
Nichiren temples